The Philippines participated at the 15th Southeast Asian Games held in Kuala Lumpur, Malaysia from 20–31 August 1989.

SEA Games performance
Swimmer Eric Buhain won three gold medals in his favorite events, all in record times, to become the best performer among close to 3,000 peers that represented nine other Southeast Asian neighbors. Buhain's feat served as the saving grace in the otherwise mediocre and scandalous participation of the Philippines in the biennial meet. 15-year old swimming star Akiko Thomson and Buhain's teammate in the swimming squad, also shone with three gold medals, fashioned out in record-breaking times of both the national and SEA Games marks. Elma Muros, tagged to win at least four gold medals, settled for only two following a leg injury, took the gold in long jump, surpassing the Asian Games standard, to become the only other athlete in the field, outside of Buhain to better an Asian record.

The results of the 26 gold medals harvest was the worst finish of any Philippine delegation to the SEA Games. It came too short of an earlier projection of 59 gold medals. Many dubbed the Philippine participation as a debacle or a disaster as cries of resignation for sports leaders were heard.

Medalists

Gold

Silver

Bronze

Multiple

Medal summary

By sports

References

External links
http://www.olympic.ph

Southeast Asian Games
Nations at the 1989 Southeast Asian Games
1989